Koottukar is a 1966 Indian Malayalam-language film, directed by J. Sasikumar. The film stars Prem Nazir, Sathyan, Sheela and Adoor Bhasi. The film had musical score by M. S. Baburaj. It is the first Malayalam film that focused on the theme of communal harmony.

Cast
Prem Nazir as Rahim
Sathyan
Sheela as Radha
Adoor Bhasi
Thikkurissy Sukumaran Nair as Raman Nair
Manavalan Joseph as Haji
Ambika as Kadeeja, Rahim's sister
Kottarakkara Sreedharan Nair as Mammootty, father of Rahim and Kadeeja
S. P. Pillai as a doctor, Radha's father
Aranmula Ponnamma as Kaathamma, Raman Nair's wife

Soundtrack
The music was composed by M. S. Baburaj and the lyrics were written by Vayalar Ramavarma.

References

External links
 

1966 films
1960s Malayalam-language films
Films directed by J. Sasikumar